The Sera A is the top-level of association football in Somaliland. It was first contested in 2001.

Champions
2001: ?
2003: Toghdeer
2004: Sanaag
2007: ?
2011: Hargeisa
2012: Maroodi-jeeh
2013: Maroodi-jeeh
2016: Awdal
2020: Daadmadheed

References

Football in Somalia